At the Gate of Sethu is the seventh studio album by American technical death metal band Nile. The album was released on June 29, 2012, in Europe, and on July 3, 2012, in North America through Nuclear Blast.

On May 25, 2012, the album's second track, "The Fiends Who Come to Steal the Magick of the Deceased", debuted on Noisecreep.

On November 22, 2012, Nile released their music video for "Enduring the Eternal Molestation of Flame".

The album's artwork was handled by Spiros "Seth Siro Anton" Antoniou of Septic Flesh.

It is Nile's highest charting album to date, hitting 131 on the U.S. charts.

Track listing

Personnel
 Nile
 Karl Sanders − guitars, vocals, bass, keyboards, glissentar, baglama saz
 Dallas Toler-Wade − guitars, vocals, bass
 George Kollias − drums

 Additional personnel
 Jon Vesano − vocals
 Jason Hagan − vocals
 Mike Breazeale − vocals

 Production
 Neil Kernon − production, mixing, engineering
 Bob Moore − additional engineering
 Spiros Antoniou − artwork

Charts

References

2012 albums
Nile (band) albums
Nuclear Blast albums
Albums produced by Neil Kernon
Albums with cover art by Spiros Antoniou